Sakimichan is the pen-name of Yue Wang, a Canadian artist known for her digital paintings and unique style, particularly those in which she draws fanarts of game and popular characters, and creating gifs for her fans with voice-acting.

Education and work
After graduating from Dawson College in 3D animation in 2012, she began work at BioWare as a Junior Concept Artist where she worked briefly on designs for Mass Effect: Andromeda. She participated in various art and comic conventions, including the Anime Expo in Los Angeles, and is a regular artist at both Anime North and Fan Expo Canada in Toronto. In 2017, she attended the Singapore Toy Game and Comic Convention (STGCC) as a guest artist. Currently, she makes most of her income from creating both original and fan-based work and tutorials on Patreon. In 2019, she started a sponsor page for Chinese fans.

Some of her fan art pieces include genderbends, where a male character is redesigned as a female character or vice versa.

References

Canadian digital artists
Pseudonymous artists
Canadian women painters
Living people
1991 births
21st-century Canadian women artists